A public alternative school is a state school that "provides alternative learning experiences to the conventional school program and which is available by choice to every family in the community at no extra cost".  They include:
Open school
School Without Walls
Learning centers
Continuation school
Multicultural schools
Free school
Schools within schools

Examples
Woodburn Success Alternative High School
Al Kennedy Alternative High School
Connections Alternative School
City School
Metropolitan Learning Center (Portland, Oregon)

References

School types
Public education
Alternative education